Egil Halmøy (2 October 1901 – 24 January 1984) was a Norwegian politician for the Liberal Party.

He served as a deputy representative to the Norwegian Parliament from Sør-Trøndelag during the term 1961–1965.

References

1901 births
1984 deaths
Liberal Party (Norway) politicians
Deputy members of the Storting